OICI may refer to:
Ilam Airport, Iran (ICAO code)
Office of Intelligence and Counterintelligence, an office of the United States Department of Energy that focuses on gathering intelligence for the department